The Constitution of the State of Nevada is the organic law of the state of Nevada, and the basis for Nevada's statehood as one of the United States.

History
The Nevada Constitution was created in 1864 at a convention on July 4 in Carson City.  The convention adjourned on July 28, was approved by public vote on the first Wednesday in September, and became effective on October 31, when on that date President Abraham Lincoln declared Nevada to be a state.

Nevada's entry into full statehood in the United States was expedited.  Union sympathizers were so eager to gain statehood for Nevada that they rushed to send the entire state constitution by telegraph to the United States Congress before the presidential election and they did not believe that sending it by train would guarantee that it would arrive on time.  The constitution was sent October 26–27, 1864, just two weeks before the election on November 7, 1864.  The transmission took two days; it consisted of 16,543 words and cost $4,303.27 ($62,295.77 adjusted for 2012) to send. It was, at the time, the longest telegraph transmission ever made, a record it held for seventeen years, until a copy of the 118,000-word English Revised Version of the New Testament was sent by telegraph on  May 22, 1881.

General provisions
The document has two prefix provisions; a preamble; 19 articles (one having been repealed); and a suffix provision. The first prefix provision defines the requirement that the state have a constitutional convention. The second prefix provision declares certain mandates applicable to the state, including a prohibition on slavery, religious freedom, and declaring the public lands to be property of the United States. Later amendments changed this provision. The preamble reads: "We the people of the State of Nevada Grateful to Almighty God for our freedom in order to secure its blessings, insure domestic tranquility, and form a more perfect Government, do establish this Constitution."

The articles of the Nevada Constitution are:

Declaration of Rights
Right of Suffrage
Distribution of Powers
Legislative Department
Executive Department
Judicial Department
Impeachment and Removal From Office
Municipal and Other Corporations
Finance and State Debt
Taxation
Education
Militia
Public Institutions
Boundary
Miscellaneous Provisions
Amendments
Schedule
[Right of Suffrage] Repealed in 1992
Initiative and Referendum

The suffix provision provides for the election of delegates to the constitutional convention.

Unappropriated public lands

Ownership of the public domain by the United States has become controversial in recent years, the Sagebrush Rebellion and the Bundy standoff are examples of certain groups within the State desire to locally manage the public lands within their borders.

The clause disclaiming any right to unappropriated lands originally stated:
	
Third. That the people inhabiting said territory do agree and declare, that they forever disclaim all right and title to the unappropriated public lands lying within said territory, and that the same shall be and remain at the sole and entire disposition of the United States; and that lands belonging to citizens of the United States, residing without the said state, shall never be taxed higher than the land belonging to the residents thereof; and that no taxes shall be imposed by said state on lands or property therein belonging to, or which may hereafter be purchased by, the United States, unless otherwise provided by the congress of the United States.

After an amendment ratified in the general election of 1996, the clause reads:

Third. That the people inhabiting said territory do agree and declare, that lands belonging to citizens of the United States, residing without the said state, shall never be taxed higher than the land belonging to the residents thereof; and that no taxes shall be imposed by said state on lands or property therein belonging to, or which may hereafter be purchased by, the United States, unless otherwise provided by the Congress of the United States.

The amendment is specified to take effect "on the date Congress consents to amendment or a legal determination is made that such consent is not necessary".

Miscellaneous provisions
The constitutional amendment went into force on November 24, 2020. Section 21 of Article 1 of the Nevada Constitution now reads:
“1. The State of Nevada and its political subdivisions shall recognize marriages and issue marriage licenses to couples regardless of gender.
2. Religious organizations and members of the clergy have the right to refuse to solemnize a marriage, and no person has the right to make any claim against a religious organization or member of the clergy for such a refusal.
3. All legally valid marriages must be treated equally under the law." (Sources: Recognition of same-sex unions in Nevada and LGBT rights in Nevada)
Article 1, section 22, approved by the voters in 2008, limits the power of the state to use eminent domain, which was in response to the decision of the U.S. Supreme Court in Kelo v. City of New London.
Article 2, Section 10, requires the legislature to set a limit on initiative, referendum, primary or general election contributions to $5,000 each, and to provide for felony penalties for contributions above this limit.
Article 4, Section 38, permits the use of medical marijuana.
Article 5, Section 3, limits the Governor to two terms, or one if (s)he has served more than two years of someone else's term.
Article 15, Section 16, sets a minimum wage of $5.15 per hour if the employer provides health insurance, or $6.15 if not.
Article 8, Section 9, bars subsidies to private companies.

Amendment procedure
Section 1 of article 19 specifies how the Assembly or Senate may propose amendments to the constitution.  A majority of all members of both houses must pass the proposed amendment.  The proposed amendment must then pass the next consecutive biennial session.  If it passes, the proposed amendment is sent to the people for vote.  If the majority of the registered votes pass the amendment, the constitution is amended/changed. Sections 2 and 3 of article 19 defines how citizen initiatives for constitutional amendments can be approved. In short, ballot initiatives must be approved in two general elections.

Sexual orientation and gender identity or expression inclusion
The measure Question 1 formally appeared on the ballot within November 2022, by 58% approval from Nevadan voters - in becoming the first US state in history to add the words "sexual orientation and gender identity or expression" to the constitution.

References

External links
Text of the Constitution of Nevada

1864 in American law
Nevada
Nevada law
1864 in American politics
1864 in Nevada